The Australian cricket team toured the West Indies from 16 March to 27 April 2012. The tour consisted of two Twenty20 Internationals (T20Is), five One Day Internationals (ODIs) and three Test matches.

Squads 

Notes

Tour Match

WICB President's XI v Australians

ODI series

1st ODI

2nd ODI

3rd ODI

4th ODI

5th ODI

T20I series

1st T20I

2nd T20I

Test series

1st Test

2nd Test

3rd Test

References

2011-12
2011–12 West Indian cricket season
2012 in Australian cricket
International cricket competitions in 2011–12
2012 in West Indian cricket